Silambur (North) is a village in the Udayarpalayam taluk of Ariyalur district, Tamil Nadu, India.

Demographics 

As per the 2001 census, Silambur (North) had a total population of 1309 with 666 males and 643 females.

References 

Villages in Ariyalur district